Jon Ander Serantes (born 24 October 1989) is a Spanish professional footballer who plays as a goalkeeper and currently play for FC Imabari.

Club career

Barakaldo and Athletic
Born in Barakaldo, Biscay, Basque Country, Serantes graduated from Barakaldo CF's youth system after spells at Santutxu FC and Athletic Bilbao. He made his debut as a senior in 2008, while on loan at amateurs SD Deusto.

Serantes subsequently returned to Barakaldo in June 2009, and spent the following two seasons as a backup to Igor Etxebarrieta. On 19 January 2011, he signed a two-year contract with former side Athletic to be made effective in July, being assigned to the reserves.

On 24 July 2013, Serantes returned to his hometown club in a season-long loan deal. He appeared in all Segunda División B matches during his tenure, and was subsequently released by Athletic on 26 May 2014.

Lugo
On 9 July 2014, Serrantes signed for Segunda División's CD Lugo. On 1 September, he was loaned to another second-tier team, CD Leganés, for a year.

Serantes played his first match as a professional on 23 November 2014, starting in a 1–0 away loss against CD Mirandés.

Leganés
Serantes terminated his contract with the Galicians on 2 July 2015, and joined Leganés on a two-year deal a day later. He featured in all 42 games in the first season in his second spell, helping the club reach La Liga for the first time in its 87-year history and finishing second in the Ricardo Zamora Trophy in the process.

Serantes made his debut in the Spanish top flight on 22 August 2016, keeping a clean sheet in a 1–0 away win over RC Celta de Vigo. On 8 September, he was named the La Liga Player of the Month. Shortly after, during the first half of a league match at RCD Espanyol, he suffered a serious knee injury, and was sidelined for the rest of the campaign.

Later years
On 30 December 2018, Serantes moved abroad for the first time in his career, signing for Japan's Avispa Fukuoka after terminating his contract with Leganés. He returned to Spain and its second division on 1 February 2021, on a six-month deal at CD Tenerife.

On 7 August 2021, Serantes joined Primera División RFEF side UD Logroñés on a two-year contract.

FC Imabari
On 12 December 2022, Jon Ander Serantes returned to Japan and officially transferred to J3 club, FC Imabari for the upcoming 2023 season after contract with UD Logrones end in half season.

International career
Uncapped by Spain at any level, Serantes made his debut for the unofficial Basque Country team on 12 October 2018, in a 4–2 win over Venezuela at the Mendizorrotza Stadium. He played the second half in place of Asier Riesgo.

References

External links

Jon Ander Serantes at FC Imabari

1989 births
Living people
Spanish footballers
Footballers from Barakaldo
Association football goalkeepers
La Liga players
Segunda División players
Segunda División B players
Tercera División players
Divisiones Regionales de Fútbol players
Barakaldo CF footballers
SD Deusto players
Bilbao Athletic footballers
CD Lugo players
CD Leganés players
CD Tenerife players
UD Logroñés players
J2 League players
Avispa Fukuoka players
J3 League players
FC Imabari players
Basque Country international footballers
Spanish expatriate footballers
Expatriate footballers in Japan
Spanish expatriate sportspeople in Japan
Santutxu FC players